Mir Shawkat Ali, Bir Uttom (11 January 1938 - 20 November 2010) was a general in Bangladesh Army and also a politician of the Bangladesh Nationalist Party. He was a freedom fighter during Bangladesh liberation war and a Sector Commander of the Mukti Bahini. He was the state minister Food, and cabinet minister of Labour and Manpower. He was awarded the Bir Uttom for his contribution during Bangladesh liberation war.

Early life
He was born in Nazira Bazar, Dhaka, East Bengal on 11 January 1938 . He studied at Mahuttuli Free Primary School in Dhaka. He graduated from Armanitola Government High School in 1953 and Dhaka College in 1955. After graduation he joined the Pakistan Military Academy. In 1958 he received his commission in Pakistan army.

Military career

In Pakistan army 
He was commissioned in the 1st East Bengal Regiment (Senior Tigers) but served in a number of units including the military intelligence department. He first experience of battle came from the 1965 Indo-Pak War in Rangpur border. He joined the Eighth East Bengal Regiment in 1971 at Sholasahar, Chittagong.

Bangladesh liberation war 
After Operation searchlight on 25 March 1971, he revolted with his unit the Eighth East Bengal Regiment. He joined the Bangladesh Liberation war. On 30 March 1971 he was given command of the entire Regiment.

He commanded the Battle of Kalurghat in April 1971. After Kalurghat fell he retreated to Bandarban with his unit. He crossed the border into India. After the formation of Mujibnagar government he was appointed sector-5 commander. He commanded 12 thousand men in his sector. In August 1971 he was promoted to Lieutenant colonel.

For his gallantry he was awarded Bir Uttom, the second highest award in Bangladesh for his role in the war.

In Bangladesh army 
He formed the Infantry Brigade in Chittagong from 1972 to 1974. In 1975 he was made the Chief of General Staff of Bangladesh army. He was chairman of Old Dhaka Development Committee and Bangladesh Football Federation, Chief Martial Law Administrator of Dhaka.

From 1980 to 1981 he was the Principal Staff Officer of the Bangladesh Army.

He retired in the rank of Lieutenant-General.

Political career 
After retirement he served as ambassador to Egypt, Austria, United Kingdom, Sudan, Germany, and Portugal. He resigned his diplomatic post in protest against the dictatorship of Hussain Muhammad Ershad.

He joined the Bangladesh Nationalist Party shortly afterwards. In 1991 he was elected to parliament from Dhaka-8. He was the state minister Food, and cabinet minister of Labour and Manpower . He was the vice president of Sector Commanders Forum.

War criminals trial 
As a freedom fighter he took issue with BNP's alliance with Jamaat-e-Islami since their top leaders were accused of war crime. He left BNP because of disagreements with chairperson Khaleda Zia regarding Jamaat-e-Islami inclusion in the Four Party Alliance. In a statement he said,"It hurts my conscience when I have to sit with Razakaar and al-Badrs at the same table. It reminds me of the days in 1971 when boys fought under my command and laid down their lives." He was one of the pioneers of war crimes trial movement. He campaigned countrywide to raise support for the trial.

Death 
On 20 November 2010 he died in Dhaka, Bangladesh. He was buried with full military honors in Banani Military graveyard.

References

Bangladesh Army generals
Bangladesh Nationalist Party politicians
High Commissioners of Bangladesh to the United Kingdom
1938 births
2010 deaths
Mukti Bahini personnel
5th Jatiya Sangsad members
6th Jatiya Sangsad members
Recipients of the Bir Uttom
Principal Staff Officers (Bangladesh)